James Garnett may refer to:

 James M. Garnett (1770–1843), American planter and politician
 James Garnett (cricketer) (1809–1842), Barbados-born English cricketer
 James Clerk Maxwell Garnett (1880–1958), English educationist, barrister, and peace campaigner